Bryan Iguchi (born 1973) is a professional snowboarder.  He is of half-Japanese ancestry. 

Born in Los Angeles, California, he has been snowboarding for more than 30 years and his nickname is "Guch".  He learned to snowboard at Mountain High and Big Bear mountains in southern California but since the late 1990s has been living in Jackson Hole in Wyoming.  He chose Jackson over other resorts because of the terrain and the small community.

Iguchi’s accomplishments in snowboarding include a second-place win in the World Half Pipe Championships in 1992, X Games bronze medallist in 1997, and numerous segments in widely distributed snowboarding films.

Iguchi has had some of his artwork presented at public exhibitions.

References

 Rider profile at volcom
 Interview with Bryan Iguchi for snowrev.com
 Ambassador / athlete page at Jackson Hole resort

American male snowboarders
Living people
1973 births
American sportspeople of Japanese descent